The 2021 Qatar Grand Prix (officially known as the Formula 1 Ooredoo Qatar Grand Prix 2021) was a Formula One motor race, held on 21 November 2021 at the Losail International Circuit in Qatar. The inaugural Qatar Grand Prix, it was the 20th round of the 2021 Formula One World Championship. 

Mercedes driver Lewis Hamilton won the race ahead of Red Bull driver Max Verstappen, while Alpine's Fernando Alonso scored his first podium since the 2014 Hungarian Grand Prix, as well as his first podium with Team Enstone since the 2009 Singapore Grand Prix.

As a result of Hamilton's victory, Losail became the 30th different circuit where he has won a Grand Prix.

Background 

The Qatar Grand Prix did not feature on the original calendar, but was added in place of the Australian Grand Prix, which was cancelled due to the COVID-19 pandemic.

Championship standings 
Heading into the race, Max Verstappen led the World Drivers' Standings with 332.5 points, 14 points ahead of second-placed Lewis Hamilton. Valtteri Bottas was in third on 203 points, too far behind Verstappen to be able to win the title but 25 points ahead of Sergio Pérez in fourth, with Lando Norris fifth on 151 points. In the World Constructors' Standings, Mercedes led with 521.5 points, 11 points ahead of second-placed Red Bull Racing. Ferrari were third with 287.5 points ahead of McLaren on 256. Alpine and AlphaTauri were fifth and sixth with 112 points each, with Alpine being ahead courtesy of a win, compared to no wins for AlphaTauri.

Entrants 

The drivers and teams were the same as the season entry list with no additional stand-in drivers for the race or practice.

Tyre choices 
Sole tyre supplier Pirelli allocated the C1, C2, and C3 compounds of tyre to be used during this Grand Prix weekend.

Practice 
The event held three practice sessions, each lasting one hour. The first two practice sessions were on Friday, 19 November at 13:30 and 17:00 local time (UTC+03:00) respectively. The first practice session ended with Max Verstappen fastest for Red Bull Racing, ahead of AlphaTauri driver Pierre Gasly and Mercedes driver Lewis Hamilton. Second practice ended with Valtteri Bottas fastest, then Gasly and Verstappen. In the third practice session, held on Saturday from 14:00, Bottas was again fastest, with his teammate Hamilton second.

Qualifying 
Qualifying took place at 17:00 local time, and lasted one hour.

Qualifying classification 

Notes
  – Max Verstappen received a five-place grid penalty for failing to respect a double waved yellow flag in Q3.
  – Valtteri Bottas received a three-place grid penalty for failing to respect a single waved yellow flag in Q3.

Race 
The race began at 17:00 local time and was contested over 57 laps. The race was noted for four front-left tyre failures, as teams attempted to run one-stop strategies against Pirelli's advice.

Race classification 

Notes
  – Includes one point for fastest lap.

Championship standings after the race

Drivers' Championship standings

Constructors' Championship standings

 Note: Only the top five positions are included for both sets of standings.
 Bold text indicates competitors who still had a theoretical chance of becoming World Champion.

Notes

References

External links 

Qatar
Qatar Grand Prix
Qatar Grand Prix
Grand Prix